ACJC may refer to:

Alliance of Concerned Jewish Canadians, a Canadian Jewish coalition
Anglo-Chinese Junior College, a junior college in Dover, Singapore